The NBA or National Basketball Association is a men's professional basketball league in North America.

NBA may also refer to:

Chemistry
3-Nitrobenzanthrone
3-Nitrobenzyl alcohol
n-Butylamine an organic compound

Sports
National Boxing Association, a boxing sanctioning body that became the World Boxing Association in 1962
Nepal Basketball Association, the national basketball association of Nepal participating in the FIBA Asia zone of the International Basketball Federation (FIBA)
Nippon Badminton Association, the national governing body for the sport of badminton in Japan

Other uses
.nba, a file extension used by Nero software.
NBA (video game series), the video game series based on the National Basketball Association
NBA (2005 video game), a 2005 basketball video game
Narmada Bachao Andolan, a political movement in India against a dam built on the Narmada River
National Bank Act, the primary federal legislation authorizing the creation of national banks in the United States
National Bar Association (United States)
National Board of Accreditation, a higher education accreditation body in India 
National Book Award, an award given for literary achievement in the United States
National Braille Association (United States)
Net Book Agreement (United Kingdom)
Neue Bach-Ausgabe, the second complete edition of the music of J. S. Bach
New Barnet railway station, London, England, National Rail station code
Newcastle Brown Ale (United Kingdom)
Nihon Bus Association
North British Academy of Arts (United Kingdom)
News Broadcasters Association, a private organization of broadcasters in India.
National Biodiversity Authority
YoungBoy Never Broke Again, an American rapper

See also